Andre Sommersell (born June 26, 1980) is a former  NFL linebacker. He was Mr. Irrelevant in the 2004 NFL Draft, and was selected by the Oakland Raiders. Sommersell was born in Guyana but played high school football in Fountain Valley, California.

In early summer 2005, Sommersell signed with the NFL Europe team Berlin Thunder played one season in Europe.

In mid-2005, Andre Sommersell resigned from the National Football League to pursue his professional business career.

External links
Just Sports Stats

1980 births
Living people
People from Fountain Valley, California
Canadian football linebackers
Colorado State Rams football players
Sportspeople from Orange County, California
Players of American football from California
Guyanese players of American football
Guyanese players of Canadian football